Rethondes is a commune in the Oise department in northern France. It is associated with the signing of the armistice of 11 November 1918, which ended World War I, although the actual location of the signing was on the other side of the Aisne in the commune of Compiègne. The same spot was also where Nazi Germany had Vichy government sign the armistice of 22 June 1940, during World War II.

Population

See also
Communes of the Oise department

References

Communes of Oise